For the American racehorse trainer see: David A. Whiteley

David Whiteley is a British TV and radio presenter. He is the co-presenter of ITV News Anglia alongside Becky Jago.

Whiteley presented the regional BBC One programme Inside Out East until it was cancelled in 2020.

He has presented two BBC documentaries about Star Wars: The Galaxy Britain Built: Droids, Darth Vader and Lightsabers, and Toy Empire: The British Force Behind Star Wars Toys about the toymaker Palitoy.

In 2021, Whiteley replaced Jonathan Wills as co-presenter of ITV News Anglia.

Bibliography

References

External links
 BBC Radio Norfolk - David Whiteley
 BBC Profile

1977 births
BBC people
British male journalists
British reporters and correspondents
English television presenters
Living people